Tylopilus louisii is a bolete fungus in the family Boletaceae. Described as new to science in 1964 by Belgian mycologist Paul Heinemann, it is found in the Republic of the Congo. It has a gray cap and stipe, and spores measuring 10–11.7 by 3.5–3.8 µm.

See also
List of North American boletes

References

External links

louisii
Fungi described in 1964
Fungi of Africa